The Best Smooth Jazz... Ever! is a compilation album released in 2004 by EMI. It is the first jazz music part of the series "The Best... Ever!".

Track listing

CD 1
US3 - "Cantaloop" 
Buddy Rich - "The Beat Goes On"
Bobby Womack - "California Dreaming"
Jose Feliciano/Minnie Riperton - "Light My Fire" 
Bill Withers - "Ain't No Sunshine"
Cassandra Wilson - "I Can`t Stand The Rain"
Louis Armstrong - "We Have All The Time In The World" 
Julie London-"Fly Me To The Moon"
Billy Taylor - "I Wish I Knew How It Would Feel To Be Free" 
Ronnie Laws - "Always There"
Charlie Hunter feat. Norah Jones - "More Than This"
St. Germain - "Sure Thing"
Paul Jackson Jr feat. Earic Dawkins - "Inner City Blues" 
Earl Klugh - "I Heard It Through The Grapevine"
Bobby McFerrin - "Don't Worry, Be Happy"
Nina Simone - "Work Song"
Nat King Cole - "Nature Boy"

CD 2
Guru feat. D C Lee - "No Time To Play" 
D'Angelo - "Brown Sugar"
Bobbie Gentry - "Son Of A Preacher Man" 
Bob Dorough - "Three Is A Magic Number" 
St. Germain - "Rose Rouge"
Shuggie Otis - "Strawberry Letter 23" 
Nancy Wilson - "Call Me" 
Donald Byrd - "Just My Imagination (Running Away With Me)"
Luther Vandross - "So Amazing"
Cassandra Wilson - "Time After Time"
Minnie Riperton - "Loving You"
Bob Belden - "Sister Moon"
Carleen Anderson - "Maybe I'm Amazed" 
Peggy Lee - "I'm A Woman"
Nat King Cole - "Unforgettable"
Lou Rawls - "The Girl From Ipanema"
Cannonball Adderley - "Sambop"
Elsa Soares - "Mas Que Nada"

CD 3
Lou Rawls - 'For What It's Worth"
Maze - "Joy And Pain"
Timmy Thomas - "Why Can't We Live Together"
The Isley Brothers - "That Lady"
Bobbi Humphrey - "You Are The Sunshine Of My Life"
Marlena Shaw - "Save The Children"
Mica Paris - "Stay"
Shara Nelson - "Down That Road"
Arrested Development - "Everyday People"
Doris - "You Never Come Closer"
Natalie Cole - "This Will Be (1991 Remix)"
Ronnie Laws - "Every Generation"
Ronny Jordan feat. Roy Ayers - "Mystic Voyage"
Bobby Hutcherson - "Theme From M.A.S.H"
Herbie Hancock - "Cantaloupe Island"
Cannoball Adderley - "Mercy Mercy"
Sarah Vaughan - "Round Midnight"
Dorothy Moore - "Misty Blue"

CD 4
Chet Baker - "My Funny Valentine"
Patricia Barber - "Use Me (Live)"
Shirley Bassey - "Something"
 Julie London - "Cry Me A River"
Peggy Lee - "Here's That Rainy Day"
Duke Ellington & Louis Armstrong - I'm Just A Lucky So And So"
Jimmy Jones Orchestra - "Stormy Weather"
Miles Davis & Cannoball Adderley - "Autumn Leaves"
Bobby McFerrin - "Thinking About Your Body"
Maze feat. Frankie Beverly - "While I'm Alone"
Noel Pointer - "Living For The City"
Ronnie Foster - "Me & Mrs Jones"
Earl Klugh - "Living Inside Your Love"
Tina Turner - "I've Been Loving You Too Long"
Swing Out Sister - "Somewhere Deep In The Night"
Lou Rawls - "You Made Me So Very Happy"
Marlena Shaw" - Woman Of The Ghetto"

Charts

References

Smooth Jazz
2004 compilation albums
Smooth jazz compilation albums